Matthew Olsen or Matthew Olson could refer to: 

Matthew G. Olsen (born 1962), American prosecutor and the former Director of the National Counterterrorism Center
Matt Olsen (born 1975), an actor best known as the voice of Bentley from the Sly Cooper game series
Matthew Olson, American soccer player and coach
Matt Olson (born 1994), American professional baseball player